Dahouara  is a town and commune in Guelma Province, Algeria. According to the 1998 census it has a population of 7791.

References

Communes of Guelma Province